The 2022–23 EHF European League is the 42nd season of Europe's secondary club handball tournament organised by European Handball Federation (EHF), and the 3rd season since it was renamed from the EHF Cup to the EHF European League.

SL Benfica are the defending champions, having defeated SC Magdeburg in the previous season final.

Qualified teams
The full list of teams qualified for each stage of the 2022–23 EHF European League was announced on 12 July 2022.

The labels in the parentheses show how each team qualified for the place of its starting round:
EL: European League title holders
CW: Cup winners
CR: Cup runners-up
4th, 5th, etc.: League position of the previous season
SF: Semi-final league position
QF: Quarter-final league position

Qualifying rounds

First qualifying round
A total of 20 teams were involved in the first qualifying round. The first leg matches were held on 27–28 August 2022, while the second leg matches were held on 3–4 September 2022. The draw was held in EHF office in Vienna.

The results of this round were:

|}

Second qualifying round
A total of 24 teams were involved in the second qualifying round, 10 teams advancing from the previous round and 14 teams entering this round. The first leg matches were held on 27 September 2022, while the second leg matches were held on 4 October 2022. The draw was held in EHF office in Vienna.

|}

Group stage

The 24 teams were divided into six pots of four teams, with a team from each pot being drawn to each group. Teams from the same country could not be drawn into the same group. The draw was held in EHF office in Vienna.

A total of 14 national associations were represented in the group stage.

Group A

Group B

Group C

Group D

Knockout stage

Pairings

Last 16

Quarterfinals

Final four

Bracket

Final

References

External links
 Official website

EHF Cup seasons
EHF European League
EHF European League
EHF European League
EHF European League
EHF European League
2022–23 EHF European League